This is a list of episodes for the Canadian animated television series Stickin' Around.

Series overview

Episodes

Season 1 (1996)
The first season of the show.

Season 2 (1997)
This is the only season that used Toon Boom.

Season 3 (1998)
The show switches back to traditional animation.

Stickin' Around